Burkholderia virus phiE122 is a bacteriophage (a virus that infects bacteria) of the family Myoviridae, genus Tigrvirus. Its genetic structure corresponds to the class I of the Baltimore classification: dsDNA, being a DNA virus.

References 

Myoviridae